Nitroethane is an organic compound having the chemical formula C2H5NO2.  Similar in many regards to nitromethane, nitroethane is an oily liquid at standard temperature and pressure.  Pure nitroethane is colorless and has a fruity odor.

Preparation 
Nitroethane is produced industrially by treating propane with nitric acid at 350–450 °C.  This exothermic reaction produces four industrially significant nitroalkanes: nitromethane, nitroethane, 1-nitropropane, and 2-nitropropane.  The reaction involves free radicals, such as CH3CH2CH2O., which arise via homolysis of the corresponding nitrite ester.  These alkoxy radicals are susceptible to C—C fragmentation reactions, which explains the formation of a mixture of products.

Alternatively, nitroethane can be produced by the Victor Meyer reaction of haloethanes such as chloroethane, bromoethane, or iodoethane with silver nitrite in diethyl ether or THF.  The Kornblum modification of this reaction uses sodium nitrite in either a dimethyl sulfoxide or dimethylformamide solvent.

Uses
Via condensations like the Henry reaction, nitroethane converts to several compounds of commercial interest.  Condensation with 3,4-dimethoxybenzaldehyde affords the precursor to the antihypertensive drug methyldopa; condensation with unsubstituted benzaldehyde yields phenyl-2-nitropropene, a precursor for amphetamine drugs. Nitroethane condenses with two equivalents of formaldehyde to give, after hydrogenation, 2-amino-2-methyl-1,3-propanediol, which in turn condenses with oleic acid to give an oxazoline, which protonates to give a cationic surfactant.

Like some other nitrated organic compounds, nitroethane is also used as a fuel additive and a precursor to Rocket propellants.

Nitroethane is a useful solvent for polymers such as polystyrene and is particularly useful for dissolving cyanoacrylate adhesives. In cosmetics applications, it has been used as a component in artificial nail remover and in overhead ceiling sealant sprays.

Nitroethane was previously used successfully as a chemical feedstock (precursor ingredient) in laboratories for the synthesis of multitudes of substances and consumer goods. For example, the medicine Pervitin (methamphetamine) was commonly used in the 19th and 20th century, and was especially popular during WWII by troops of both sides for mood elevation, appetite and sleep suppression and increasing focus and alertness). Nitroalkanes were one of many ingredients used in the synthesis of many phenethylamines, including medications such as Pervitin and the racemic compound Benzedrine (amphetamine), used as an anorectic medicine for obesity.

Toxicity
Nitroethane is suspected to cause genetic damage and be harmful to the nervous system. Typical TLV/TWA is 100 ppm. Typical STEL is 150 ppm. Skin contact causes dermatitis in humans. In animal studies, nitroethane exposure was observed to cause lacrimation, dyspnea, pulmonary rales, edema, liver and kidney injury, and narcosis.  Children have been poisoned by accidental ingestion of artificial nail remover.

The  for rats is reported as 1100 mg/kg.

References

External links
 WebBook page for C2H5NO2
 CDC - NIOSH Pocket Guide to Chemical Hazards

Nitroalkanes
Nitro solvents
Fuels
Rocket fuels
Liquid explosives
Drag racing